Étienne Léopold Trouvelot was a French astronomer and entomologist.

Trouvelot may also refer to:

 Trouvelot (lunar crater)
 Trouvelot (Martian crater)